Gouravam can refer to: 
Gauravam (1973 film), a Tamil film starring Sivaji Ganesan
Gouravam (2013 film), a Tamil and Telugu bilingual film featuring Allu Sirish